Slater is an unincorporated community in Clay Township, Auglaize County, Ohio, United States.

The Slater Crossing Station was built in 1893 for the Ohio Southern Railroad, the building was later moved to a farm south of the Slater railroad crossing and stood until the early 1980s.  Although there was never a post office here, Slater, Ohio is listed as a shipping and mailing address with the US Express and on the St. Marys Branch of the Toledo and Ohio Central Railroad in 1903.

References

Unincorporated communities in Auglaize County, Ohio